My Year of Meats is the 1998 debut novel by Ruth Ozeki. The book takes advantage of the differences between Japanese and American culture to comment on both.

Overview 
Jane Takagi-Little is a Japanese-American documentary filmmaker who is hired to work for a Japanese production company, where she uncovers some unsavory truths about love, fertility, and a dangerous hormone called DES. The company works with BEEF-EX to promote the use of American beef in Japan by creating a Japanese television show called My American Wife!.

Parallel to Jane's story is the life of Akiko Ueno, a former manga artist who specialized in horror scenes and is reluctantly married to Joichi "John" Ueno, who works for BEEF-EX. John cares only that Akiko has a baby and forces her to watch My American Wife and cook the recipes, believing that it will allow her to conceive. However, as Akiko's independence and sense of self grows from watching the show and cooking for John, her  relationship with John becomes violent.

The book switches point of view from Jane Takagi-Little and Akiko Ueno.

Awards 
 Kiriyama Prize
Imus/Barnes and Noble American Book Award

Reviews 
 Newsweek
 Chicago Tribune
 Publishers Weekly

References 

1998 American novels
Novels by Ruth Ozeki
Novels set in Japan
1998 debut novels
Japan in non-Japanese culture
Novels set in the United States